Helhoughton is a village and civil parish in Norfolk, England. The nearest railway station is at Sheringham for the Bittern Line which runs between Sheringham, Cromer and Norwich. The nearest airport is Norwich International Airport. The parish had, in the 2001 census, a population of 197, rising to 346 at the 2011 Census. For the purposes of local government, the parish falls within the district of North Norfolk.

Geography

Helhoughton is a small parish in northwest part of the county of Norfolk. The parish is bordered to the north by the parish of Tattersett and to the south by the parish of Raynham. To the west is the parish of West Rudham and to the east is the parish of Dunton where the parish boundary line is partly the course of the River Wensum the large landscape park surrounding Raynham Hall  is on the east side of the riverbank. The tributary of the Wensum called the River Tat also passes through the northern rim of the parish. The small hamlet of Painston, which can be found on Faden's map of 1797, was to the west of the village and has now virtually disappeared with only Painswhin Farm, which dates to the 18th century,  on the site of the lost settlement. The name Helhoughton is thought to derive from a mixture of Old English and Old Scandinavian and has the meaning farmstead of a man named Helgi.

Landmarks
Much of this church dates from the medieval period. The building is constructed from flint and stone with some brick dressings. The roof is of slate with the tower having a leaded roof. The chancel dates from the 14th century and has two bays. The tower is at the western end of the church and dates from the 15th century. The nave dates from the late 18th century when most of it was rebuilt. Inside the church there is a stone octagonal font attached to its base by 5 shafts with chamfered corners and rounded spurs. The bowl is also octagonal. Within the chancel there are two decorated windows with a priest's door in between them. On the eastern elevation there is also a decorated window under brick arch with drip moulds and  tracery. The west door is perpendicular with a double hollow chamfered four-centred arch and fleurons and ball flower decoration. The doors has six panels and with a  gothic head and dates from 1790. On one wall can be seen an early 17th-century Stuart Royal Arms, but with AR (Anna Regina) monogram, which has been relettered at some point for Queen Anne from James I, whose motto, Exurgat Deus et Dissipentur Inimici ('Rise up o God and put down my enemies') has not been altered and dates this coat of arms to 1706.

Notable people
 Marshal of the Royal Air Force Sir David Craig was created Baron Craig of Radley, of Helhoughton in the County of Norfolk in 1991.

References

External links

Villages in Norfolk
Civil parishes in Norfolk
North Norfolk